Partha Mukherjee  was an Indian actor who worked in Bengali cinema. mainly as supporting actor. He has worked in movies like Dhanyee Meye, Agnishwar, Amar Prithivi, Baag Bandi Khela. He is particularly known for his boy-next-door looks. He works with actors like Sabitri Chatterjee, Ranjit Mallick, Uttam Kumar, Soumitra Chatterjee, Santu Mukhopadhyay and Dipankar Dey etc. Beside acting on films, he is also a passionate singer.

Early life and education
Partha Mukherjee  was born on 27 March 1947 in Kolkata, West Bengal. After passing Higher Secondary Examination from Chakraberia Higher Secondary School of Kolkata he studied B.Com  at the  Charuchandra College in 1965 and later enrolled for M.Com at the Calcutta University but could not appear for exams due to the film offers .

Struggling days
After getting a break as a child actor in the film “ Maa ” directed by Chitto Basu in 1958 he portrayed a number of memorable roles in the 1960s. Based on Rabindranath Tagore's cult short story Atithia Tapan Sinha cast him as the protagonist in Bengali film " Atithia ". Partha Mukherjee   also acted in Tapan Sinha's Bengali movie “ Aponjon “.  Known to carry himself well in both comedy,  serious and tragic roles, Partha  Mukherjee was at one time an automatic choice as Bengal film legend Uttam Kumar's on-screen brother or son in several Bengali movies. He acted more than 100 Bengali movies.

Personal life
He married music director Ashima Bhattacharya.

Death
He died of cardiac arrest at the age of 70.

Awards and nominations
Partha Mukherjee got wide recognition for his role in Tapan Sinha's Bengali movie 'Athithi' adapted from Rabindranath Tagore's short story. The movie participated in Venice Film Festival f but missed the best actor award with just a few votes.The TMC lead state government had conferred Partha Mukhopadhyay with a special award for his contribution to Bengali film industry.

Selected filmography

Television
He acted in several TV serials.

References

External links 
 

1947 births
2017 deaths
20th-century Indian actors
Bengali people
University of Calcutta alumni
Charuchandra College alumni